Cardiochlamys is a genus of flowering plants belonging to the family Convolvulaceae.

Its native range is Madagascar.

Species:

Cardiochlamys madagascariensis 
Cardiochlamys velutina

References

Convolvulaceae
Convolvulaceae genera